A septuple champion in boxing refers to a boxer who has won world titles in seven different categories of weight.

Recognition

Major sanctioning bodies
There is some dispute on which sanctioning body is considered "major" enough to award championships. The "Big 4" sanctioning bodies are always included. They are arranged in order of foundation:
World Boxing Association (WBA) - founded in 1921
World Boxing Council (WBC) - founded in 1963
International Boxing Federation (IBF) - founded in 1976
World Boxing Organization (WBO) - founded in 1988

The Ring
The Ring, boxing's most respected magazine, has awarded world championships in professional boxing within each weight class from its foundation in 1922 until the 1990s, and again since 2001. The Ring champions were at one point held the linear reign to the throne, the man who beat the man. The lineal champion is also known as the true champion of the division. The Ring stopped giving belts to world champions in the 1990s but began again in 2002. 

In 2002, The Ring attempted to clear up the confusion regarding world champions by creating a championship policy. It echoed many critics' arguments that the sanctioning bodies in charge of boxing championships had undermined the sport by pitting undeserving contenders against undeserving "champions", and forcing the boxing public to see mismatches for so-called "world championships". The Ring attempted to clear up the confusion regarding world champions by creating a championship policy that is "intended to reward fighters who, by satisfying rigid criteria, can justify a claim as the true and only world champion in a given weight class." The Ring claims to be more authoritative and open than the sanctioning bodies' rankings, with a page devoted to full explanations for ranking changes. A fighter pays no sanctioning fees to defend or fight for the title at stake, contrary to practices of the sanctioning bodies. Furthermore, a fighter cannot be stripped of the title unless he loses, decides to move to a different weight division, or retires.

There are currently only two ways that a boxer can win The Rings title: defeat the reigning champion; or win a box-off between the magazine's number-one and number-two rated contenders (or, sometimes, number-one and number-three rated). A vacant Ring championship is filled when the number-one contender in a weight-division battles the number-two contender or the number-three contender (in cases where The Ring determines that the number-two and number-three contenders are close in abilities and records).

In May 2012, citing the number of vacancies in various weight classes as primary motivation, The Ring unveiled a new championship policy. Under the new policy, The Ring title can be awarded when the No. 1 and No. 2 fighters face one another or when the Nos. 1 and 2 contenders choose not to fight one another and either of them fights No. 3, No. 4 or No. 5, the winner may be awarded The Ring belt. In addition, there are now six ways for a fighter to lose his title: lose a fight in his championship weight class; move to another weight class; not schedule a fight in any weight class for 18 months; not schedule a fight in his championship weight class for 18 months, even if fighting at another weight class; not scheduling a fight with a top 5 contender in any weight class for two years; or retiring.

Many media outlets and members are extremely critical of the new championship policy and state that if this new policy is followed The Ring title will lose the credibility it once held.

Lineal
The Transnational Boxing Rankings Board (TBRB) hands out the official version of the lineal championship. TBRB awards vacant championships when the two top-ranked fighters in any division meet and currently recognizes legitimate world champions or "true champions" each weight classes. The Board was formed to continue where The Ring "left off" in the aftermath of its purchase by Golden Boy Promotions in 2007 and the following dismissal of Nigel Collins. After the new editors announced a controversial new championship policy in May 2012, three prominent members of the Ring Advisory Panel resigned. This three members (Springs Toledo, Cliff Rold and Tim Starks) became the founding members of the Transnational Boxing Rankings Board, which was formed over the summer of 2012 with the assistance of Stewart Howe of England.

Since 2012, lineal champions are predetermined by the Transnational Boxing Rankings Board, which promotes the concept of a singular world champion per weight class. Lineal champions are listed on Cyber Boxing Zone website which list lineal champions of the Queensberry Era to date.

Minor sanctioning bodies
The International Boxing Organization (IBO) is sometimes included in the list of major boxing organizations. 
Besides the IBO, there are other sanctioning bodies. They are:  International Boxing Association (IBA), International Boxing Council (IBC), International Boxing Board (IBB), International Boxing League (IBL), International Boxing Union (IBU), Global Boxing Association (GBA), Global Boxing Council (GBC), Global Boxing Federation GBF, Global Boxing Organization (GBO), Global Boxing Union (GBU), National Boxing Association (NBA), Transcontinental World Boxing Association (TWBA), Universal Boxing Association (UBA), Universal Boxing Council (UBC), Universal Boxing Federation (UBF), Universal Boxing Organization (UBO), UNIBOX, United States Boxing Council (USBC), World Athletic Association (WAA), World Boxing Forum (WBF), World Boxing Board (WBB), World Boxing Championship Committee (WBCC), World Boxing Empire (WBE), World Boxing Foundation (WBFo), World Boxing Institute (WBI), World Boxing League (WBL), World Boxing Network (WBN), World Boxing Union (WBU), World Cup of Boxing (WCOB), World Junior Boxing Federation (WJBF), World Tournament Boxing Federation (WTBF) and the World United Boxing Association (WUBA).

Note:
The International Boxing Association (IBA) is not to be confused with the International Boxing Association (AIBA), a French acronym for Association Internationale de Boxe Amateur, which sanctions amateur matches.
 The National Boxing Association (NBA) was established in 1984 and is not to be confused with the original National Boxing Association that was established in 1921 and changed its name to World Boxing Association (WBA) in 1962.

List of men's septuple champions
The following is a list of septuple champions who have held titles from one or more of the "Big Four" organizations (WBA, WBC, IBF, WBO) and The Ring. Note 
Dates in bold format signify the date when they won their 7th division title.

List of women's septuple champion

The following is a list of women’s septuple champions who have held titles from one or more of the "Big Four" organizations (WBA, WBC, IBF, WBO) and The Ring'''''.

Note 
Dates in bold format signify the date when they won their 7th division title.

Septuple champions that won titles in other multiple divisions
Some fighters of this group or club were not satisfied to win just the incredible milestone of championships in seven different weight divisions but to reach immortality in eight other different divisions or categories. At present, only one boxer in history has ever achieved to become Octuple Champion or a boxer who has won different titles in eight different categories of weight. Manny Pacquiao won his November 13, 2010 bout against Antonio Margarito for the vacant WBC World Super Welterweight Title, and became the first ever Octuple Champion in history of boxing.

See also
List of current world boxing champions
List of boxing triple champions
List of boxing quadruple champions
List of boxing quintuple champions
List of boxing sextuple champions
Octuple champion
List of WBA world champions
List of WBC world champions
List of IBF world champions
List of WBO world champions
List of The Ring world champions

References

External links
Boxrec.com
Boxing Records
Saddoboxing
The Ring

IBHOF
Cyberboxingzone
Transnational Boxing Rankings Board

7